Eric Tessmer (born August 19, 1981) is an American blues guitarist residing in Austin, Texas. The Austin Chronicle named Tessmer the best guitarist in the city for 2017–2018, based on their annual poll.

Early life
Tessmer was born on August 19, 1981. His father, a guitar player, named him Eric James Tessmer in honor of Eric Clapton and Jimi Hendrix. Tessmer grew up in Wisconsin, and moved to Austin at age 19 to pursue a career in guitar. He was too young to get into nightclubs and unable to afford an apartment, so he sang in gospel choirs and lived in his rehearsal space.

Career
In 2005, the Eric Tessmer Band released its first EP, “Last Night at Joe’s...”, but in 2008 the Eric Tessmer band broke up and, despite frequent touring and the release of the album Roots Rock Rhythm in 2010, Tessmer did not achieve wider recognition. In 2015, Tessmer quit drinking and began releasing EPs, some of which contain songs with themes centered on sobriety. In 2018, Tessmer was the top choice in the annual Austin Chronicle poll for the Austin Music Awards, and was named the best guitarist in Austin. In 2019, Tessmer began working with Nancy Wilson from the band Heart.

Style
Tessmer's songwriting has been described as being inspired by Stevie Ray Vaughan, to whom he was compared in his early years in Austin. He still receives comparisons to Vaughan because he plays the guitar with a similar "power and finesse". The Fender (company) recently presented him with a surf green copy of the 1959 Fender Stratocaster that he uses as his main guitar. He has also cited David Gilmour, Eric Clapton, Jimi Hendrix, and Gary Clark Jr. as inspirations. HuffPost contributor Ashley Jude Collie has described Tessmer's "soul-chedelic" style as "Tessmer’s own cocktail of R&B, soul and blues rock".

Recognition 
2017: Black Fret Major grant $18,000 
2018: Austin Chronicle Austin Music Awards, Best Guitarist

Musical equipment

Guitars
 Vintage 1959 Fender Stratocaster
1960's Danelectro Silvertone 1 pickup black and white
 Fender Custom Shop Stratocaster '59 RI Dale Wilson Masterbuilt
 Surf Green with Matching Headstock

Amplifiers
Fender Vibro-King
61' Fender 1x15 cab
Leslie

Discography
Blues Bullets (2002)
Last Night at Joe’s... Eric Tessmer Band (2005)
Green Diamond (2010)
Eric Tessmer EP1 (2016)
Eric Tessmer EP2 (2019)

See also
 Austin music

References

External links
Eric Tessmer performs 'Little Wing', live at Circuit of the Americas in Austin, TX on 11.3.17

1981 births
Living people
People from Richland Center, Wisconsin
American male guitarists
Progressive rock guitarists
Musicians from Wisconsin
American blues guitarists
20th-century American guitarists
American blues singers
21st-century American male singers
21st-century American singers
21st-century American guitarists
20th-century American male musicians
Musicians from Austin, Texas